The Van Noy Brothers of Kansas City was the collective name of the four Kansas City, Missouri, brothers who founded the old Van Noy Railway News and Hotel Company, also known as the Van Noy Interstate Co., and known today as HMSHost. They are considered, historically, very prominent members of past Kansas City Society. Through their company, they became symbols of corporate integrity and successful enterprise throughout the west.

In 1893, the eldest brother, Ira Clinton Van Noy, started a retail cigar and news business at No. 1076 Union Avenue in Kansas City. Several years later, he was joined by his other brothers Charles S., Horace Greeley, and Henry Clay VanNoy. In 1897, the Van Noy Brothers incorporated the Van Noy Railway News and Hotel Company.

The Company thrived providing retail shopping, food, and hotel accommodations to traveling consumers along the great American railway lines. Towards the latter half of 1922, the Van Noy Interstate Co changed its name to The Interstate Company after a series of mergers and acquisitions. At that point, the Van Noy Brothers were no longer involved with the management of the company they founded.

See also
Henry Clay VanNoy
Van Noy Railway News and Hotel Company
HMSHost

External links
Historic Charles S. Van Noy Mansion in Kansas City, MO

Businesspeople from Kansas City, Missouri